Anke Hartnagel (née Thomsen; 22 January 1942 – 17 April 2004) was a German politician from the Social Democratic Party.

She was Member of the Bundestag for Hamburg-Nord from 1998 to her death in 2004.

References

See also 

1942 births
2004 deaths
Deaths from cancer in Germany
Members of the Bundestag 1998–2002
Members of the Bundestag 2002–2005
20th-century German politicians
20th-century German women politicians
21st-century German politicians
21st-century German women politicians
Female members of the Bundestag
Members of the Bundestag for Hamburg
Members of the Hamburg Parliament
Members of the Bundestag for the Social Democratic Party of Germany